Brendan Hodge (born December 31, 1984) is a Canadian rower. He won a gold medal at the 2015 Pan American Games in the men's lightweight coxless four event.

In June 2016, he was officially named to Canada's 2016 Olympic team.

He graduated from Harvard College in 2007 and in 2010, he graduated from the Peter A. Allard School of Law at the University of British Columbia.

References

External links
 

1984 births
Living people
Rowers at the 2015 Pan American Games
Pan American Games gold medalists for Canada
Canadian male rowers
Rowers from Vancouver
Rowers at the 2016 Summer Olympics
Olympic rowers of Canada
Pan American Games medalists in rowing
Harvard University alumni
Peter A. Allard School of Law alumni
Medalists at the 2015 Pan American Games
21st-century Canadian people
Harvard Crimson rowers